Pir Syed Fazal Ali Shah Jillani is a Pakistani politician, and parliamentarian. He was elected a member of national assembly on a ticket of Pakistan Peoples Party from NA-209 (Khairpur) and member of Provincial Assembly of Sindh during 1997 to 1999 & 2002 to 2007 & 2008 to 2013 period Remained Federal Minister for Land Commission.Elected as Member of Provincial Assembly Sindh in 2013 to 2018.
Elected as Member Of National Assembly in 2018 till

See also
NA-209
 PS-33

References

Living people
Pakistan People's Party politicians
Sindhi people
People from Sindh
Sindh MPAs 1997–1999
Sindh MPAs 2002–2007
Pakistani MNAs 2018–2023
1970 births